4Q240 ( or 4QCanta) is believed to be a commentary (or pesher) on the Song of Songs, also known as 'Canticles'. Written in Hebrew, it was  found in Cave 4 at Qumran in the West Bank and comprises part of the Dead Sea Scrolls. From its palaeography (script) it has been identified as being early-Herodian.

Location
Included in Milik's original list, but this fragment has never been located.

See also
List of Hebrew Bible manuscripts
Dead Sea Scrolls
4Q106
4Q107
4Q108
4QMMT
6Q6
Tanakh at Qumran

References

External links
"The Dead Sea Scrolls and Why They Matter" – 4Q240 in Biblical Archaeology Review

Dead Sea Scrolls
1st-century BC biblical manuscripts